is a 12-episode anime television series produced by Eight Bit and based on the female action-figure toy product line Busou Shinki by Konami. The TV series began airing in Japan on October 4, 2012, and shortly after on internet streaming services. Sentai Filmworks released the complete Blu-ray on February 14, 2017. MVM Entertainment later released the complete series on Blu-ray on April 10, 2017.

Busou Shinki Moon Angel OVA
An original video animation, Busou Shinki Moon Angel, was produced by Kinema Citrus as a video game promotion. It was released online as ten downloadable installments beginning September 7, 2011. The installments were assembled into a 40-minute OVA and released on DVD and Blu-ray disc in Japan on March 15, 2012.

Plot summary
Tsubasa is a young boy who dreams of becoming a Shinki master. Shinki are small robot girls which can talk, fight, and fly. On a full moon night, Tsubasa finds a damaged Shinki model and takes it home. After repairing it, he gives her the name of Kaguya. They live a happy life until the former owner of Kaguya finds her.

Episode list

Busou Shinki TV series
 is a 12-episode anime television series produced by Eight Bit and based on the Busou Shinki toy product line by Konami. The TV series uses character designs and animation derived from the video games and the preceding Busou Shinki Moon Angel ONA series. The TV series began airing in Japan on October 4, 2012. The TV series was licensed in North America by Sentai Filmworks in 2012 and began streaming on The Anime Network with episodes posted shortly after they were broadcast in Japan.

Plot summary
High school freshman Rihito, who just came back from abroad, started a new life in Japan with his four Busou Shinki, female action figures with weapons. Some guys wait their entire lives to meet the girl of their dreams, but Rihito already lives with four dream girls who are eager to please him. That's because they're Shinki: 6-inch high, customizable androids. Don't let their tiny size fool you. These little ladies have full-sized intelligence and emotions, and since each one would prefer to be Rihito's favorite, there's sure to be friction! Get ready for sparks to fly as four battery-powered princesses take charge of Rihito's world in Busou Shinki!

Episode list

References

External links
 Anime Network - Watch - Busou Shinki
  

Busou Shinki